D-Smart is a Turkish satellite television provider launched in 2007. It launched high-definition television broadcasts in 2008. By late 2012, D-Smart had around 1.6m subscribers, of which around half were free-to-air customers; revenues were around EUR350m.

References

External links 
D-Smart Official Web Site

Mass media in Turkey
Direct broadcast satellite services
2007 establishments in Turkey